Villefranche – Tarare Airport  is an airport situated 10 km southwest of Villefranche-sur-Saône, a commune in the Rhône département of the Rhône-Alpes région of east-central France.

Airlines and destinations 
No scheduled commercial air service at this time.

References 

External links

Airports in Auvergne-Rhône-Alpes